, better known by his stage name , is a Japanese actor and voice actor from Niigata Prefecture, Japan.

Filmography

Television animation
1970s
The Adventures of Hutch the Honeybee (1974) – minor role
Hoshi no Ko Chobin (1974) – minor role
Hurricane Polymar (1974) – minor role
Time Bokan (1976) – Kaku-san
Ippatsu Kanta-kun (1977) – Morita
Cyborg 009 (1979) – Yacob
Gatchaman Fighter (1979) – Ganda
1980s
Gyakuten! Ippatsuman (1982) – Gulliver
Space Cobra (1982) – Leo
Cat's Eye (1983) – A police officer
Fist of the North Star (1984) – Fuuga, Junk, Gunter and others
Blue Comet SPT Layzner (1985) – Dal
Musashi no Ken (1985) – Kiyokazu Musha
Saint Seiya (1986) – Bear Geki, Centaurus Babel
City Hunter (1987) – Ogino (ep. 3)
Machine Robo: Battle Hackers (1987) – Yarsand
Transformers: The Headmasters (1987) – Apeface, Blanker (Pointblank)
Meimon! The Third Baseball Club (1988) – Sakamoto
Oishinbo (1988) – Noriaki Hirano
Sakigake!! Otokojuku (1988) – Rinkai
Transformers: Super-God Masterforce (1988) – Diver
Transformers: Victory (1989) – Blackshadow
1990s
Kinnikuman: Kinnikusei Oui Soudatsu-hen (1992) – Ramenman
Slam Dunk (1993) – Chūichirō Noma, Kengo Murasame, Shouichi Takano
Mobile Suit Gundam Wing (1995) – Tubarov
Rurouni Kenshin (1996) – Hyouei Nishida (Tsuruyo Mutoh's Brother)
Trigun (1998) – Lurald
Cowboy Bebop (1999) – Pilot (Ep. 16)
2000s
Hellsing (2001) – Second Lieutenant Parker (Ep. 9)
Ghost in the Shell: Stand Alone Complex (2002) – Police Chief (ep 17)
Kino's Journey (2003) – Poet (ep 3)
Stratos 4 (2003) – Examiner (ep 12)
Tetsujin 28-go (2004) – Kenji Murasame
Emma - A Victorian Romance (2005) – Stevens
Emma - A Victorian Romance: Second Act (2007) – Stevens
Code Geass: Lelouch of the Rebellion R2 (2008) – Carares (ep 1, 2)

OVA
Blue Comet SPT Layzner (1986) – Attila
Elf 17 (1987) – Elder
Mobile Suit Gundam 0083: Stardust Memory (1991) – Chap Adel
Giant Robo (1992) – Kenji Murasame, Narrator
Gundam Wing: Endless Waltz (1997) – Tubarov

Theatrical animation
Lupin III: The Mystery of Mamo (1978) – A police officer
Mobile Suit Gundam 0083: The Last Blitz of Zeon (1992) – Chap Adel
Slam Dunk series (1994–95) – Chūichirō Noma
Martian Successor Nadesico: The Motion Picture – Prince of Darkness (1998) – Shinjō Aritomo
Mobile Suit Gundam Special Edition (2000) – Uragan
Tetsujin 28-go: Morning Moon of Midday (2007) – Kenji Murasame
Detective Conan: The Raven Chaser (2009) – Irish

Tokusatsu
Kyuukyuu Sentai GoGo-V (1999) – Pollen Psyma Beast Baira (ep. 34)

Dubbing

Live-action
The Adventures of Buckaroo Banzai Across the 8th Dimension – President Widmark (Ronald Lacey), Casper Lindley (Bill Henderson)
Air America – Jack Neely (Art LaFleur)
Back to the Future (1989 TV Asahi edition) – Dave McFly (Marc McClure)
Criminal Minds – Ray Finnegan (William Sadler)
Dr. Quinn, Medicine Woman – Horace Bing (Frank Collison)
Executive Decision – El Sayed Jaffa (Andreas Katsulas)
Farewell My Concubine – Eunuch Zhang (Di Tong)
Guilty by Suspicion – Ray Karlin (Tom Sizemore)
The Hidden – Jack DeVries (Chris Mulkey)
In the Name of the Father – Chief PO Barker (John Benfield)
Judge Dredd (1997 Fuji TV edition) – Geiger (Ian Dury)
The Keeper – Conner Wells (Steph DuVall)
The Last Boy Scout – Alley Thug (Badja Djola), Baynard's Bodyguard (Robert Apisa)
Mercury Rising – Martin Lynch (John Carroll Lynch)
The Mission – Father John Fielding (Liam Neeson)
Platoon (1989 TV Asahi edition) – Tex (David Neidorf)
The Reincarnation of Peter Proud – Jeff Curtis (Tony Stephano)
The Sea Inside – José Sampedro (Celso Bugallo)
Showgirls – Al Torres (Robert Davi)
Turbulence – Captain Samuel Bowen (Ben Cross)
Twin Peaks – Andy Brennan (Harry Goaz)
Twin Peaks (2017) – Andy Brennan (Harry Goaz)
West Side Story (1990 TBS edition) – Police Lieutenant Schrank (Simon Oakland)

Animation
Batman: The Animated Series – Goliath
G.I. Joe: A Real American Hero – Torpedo
Looney Tunes – Narrator
The New Adventures of Winnie the Pooh – Storekeeper

References

External links
Official agency profile 

1948 births
Living people
Arts Vision voice actors
Japanese male stage actors
Japanese male video game actors
Japanese male voice actors
Male voice actors from Niigata Prefecture
20th-century Japanese male actors
21st-century Japanese male actors